was allegedly a member of the Japanese Red Army, an armed militant organization.

Arrest in The Netherlands

Police arrested Kikumura in Schiphol Airport in Amsterdam in 1986 when they found him carrying a bomb in his luggage. After spending four months in prison, a judge ruled the search of his luggage was illegal and he was deported to Japan.

Arrest in the United States

Kikumura was arrested on April 12, 1988, at a rest stop on the New Jersey Turnpike by a state trooper who thought he was acting suspiciously. He was found carrying three 18-inch (46-cm) mercury fulminate pipe bombs hidden in fire extinguishers containing roofing-nail shrapnel. Prosecutors believe that Kikumura had planned to bomb a US Navy recruitment office in the Veteran's Administration building on 34th Street in Manhattan on April 14, the anniversary of the U.S. raid on Libya.

Imprisonment

Kikumura was indicted on several counts of interstate transportation of explosive devices and passport violations. After a bench trial on stipulated facts, Kikumura was convicted on November 29, 1988, to serve 30 years in prison. Then U.S. attorney Samuel Alito represented the prosecution. In 1991, his sentence was reduced to 21 years and 10 months.

Release

Kikumura, Federal Bureau of Prisons # 09008-050, was released on April 18, 2007. He had served a sentence of 221 months (slightly more than 18 years) at Florence ADMAX USP.

Upon Kikumura's release he was sent back to Japan via San Francisco International Airport.  Upon arrival in Japan he was immediately arrested on charges of falsifying official documents. He was released in October 2007.

References

External links
Kikumura v. Hurley, No. 99-1284, U.S. Court of Appeals for the Tenth Circuit 2001 Case filed by Kikumura against Warden John Hurley for denying visitation rights by a Methodist minister.
Kikumura v. Osagie, No. 04-1249, U.S. Court of Appeals for the Tenth Circuit 2006 Case filed by Kikumura against Anthony Osagie, a physician's assistant at the prison infirmary, and other officers for a delay in treating his medical emergency.  URL accessed 16 January 2007.
* 2006 ruling on release date.

1947 births
Living people
Japanese criminals
Japanese prisoners and detainees
People convicted of arms trafficking
People from Miyazaki Prefecture
Inmates of ADX Florence
Prisoners and detainees of Japan
Japanese Red Army